The doctrine of the absolute poverty of Christ was a teaching associated with the Franciscan order of friars, particularly prominent between 1210 and 1323. The key tenet of the doctrine of absolute poverty was that Christ and the apostles had no property, whether individually or shared. Debate about this came to a head in what is known as the theoretical poverty controversy in 1322–23. Pope John XXII declared this doctrine heretical in November 1323 via the papal bull Cum inter nonnullos, but debate on the subject continued for some years after; indeed, John's own final statement on the subject came in 1329 in his Quia vir reprobus. Key aspects of the debate included: the origins of property (or 'dominion') and whether use of material objects implied ownership; whether property existed before the Fall of Man; whether Christ while on earth had dominion over temporal things; the detailed and technical status of Christ's well attested poverty; and the apostles' use of material goods.

Background
Early Franciscans were itinerant preachers, who, following their founder Francis of Assisi, took to heart the injunction in Luke 9:3 to “Take nothing for the journey,* neither walking stick, nor sack, nor food, nor money, and let no one take a second tunic." The mendicant practice of begging for alms, itself, caused some hard feelings; both on the part of monastic orders sometimes dependent on the same donors, and the donors themselves when faced with repeated appeals from local friars in lieu of more distant potential benefactors.

Over time, as the order grew, it faced the demands of caring for sick or elderly friars, and providing for those sent to university for theological training. One method to deal with this was a legal construct whereby gifts would be placed in the name of a patron, held in trust for the friars' use. In this way, they need not be perennially destitute. The "Spirituals" felt that this abrogated the spirit of the founder, and believed a restricted use of property was more in keeping with the rule. A lengthy theological discussion then ensued as to what was intended and required by the Rule.

See also
 Apostolic poverty
 Christian views on poverty and wealth
 Imitation of Christ
 
 The novel The Name of the Rose features a debate about the topic.

Further reading

 Malcolm Lambert, Franciscan Poverty: The Doctrine of the Absolute Poverty of Christ and the Apostles in the Franciscan Order 1210–1323, 2nd ed. (St. Bonaventure, 1998)
 Patrick Nold, Pope John XXII and his Franciscan Cardinal: Bertrand de la Tour and the Apostolic Poverty Controversy (Oxford, 2003)
 David Burr, The Spiritual Franciscans: From Protest to Persecution in the Century after Saint Francis (University Park, PA, 2001)
 Jürgen Miethke, ‘Der “theoretische Armutsstreit” im 14. Jahrhundert. Papst und Franziskanerorden im Konflikt um die Armut,’ in Gelobte Armut. Armutskonzepte der franziskanischen Ordensfamilie vom Mittelalter bis zur Gegenwart, ed. Heinz-Dieter Heimann, Angelica Hilsebein, Bernd Schmies, and Christoph Stiegemann (Paderborn, 2012), pp. 243–283.
 Benedikt Koehler, The economics of property rights in early and medieval Christianity, Economic Affairs, 2017, vol. 37, no. 1, pp. 112 - 123

References

Christian ethics
Poverty
Poverty and religion
Wealth
Franciscan spirituality
13th-century Catholicism
14th-century Catholicism